Zhuang characters or Sawndip are logograms derived from Chinese characters and used by the Zhuang people of Guangxi and Yunnan provinces in China to write the Zhuang languages for more than one thousand years. The script is used not only by the Zhuang but also by the closely related Bouyei in Guizhou, China; the Tay in Vietnam; and the Nùng in Yunnan, China, and Vietnam. Sawndip is a Zhuang word that means "immature characters". The Zhuang word for Chinese characters used in the Chinese language is sawgun (Sawndip: 𭨡倱; "characters of the Han"); gun is the Zhuang term for the Han Chinese. Even now, in traditional and less formal domains, Sawndip is more often used than alphabetical scripts.

Names
The name old Zhuang script is usually used to distinguish it from the Latin-based Standard Zhuang. In Standard Chinese, the old Zhuang script is called Gǔ Zhuàngzì or Fāngkuài Zhuàngzì.

Sawndip and its synonyms can be used with a spectrum of narrow to broad meanings. The narrowest meaning confines its use just to characters created by Zhuang to write Zhuang and excludes existing Chinese characters. At its broadest, it includes all the "square" characters used to write Zhuang regardless of whether they are of Chinese or Zhuang origin. However, it is not always possible to determine the origin of a character. In this article the inclusive broader meaning is usually used.

In Chinese, while usually old Zhuang script and square Zhuang script are synonymous, when used contrastively, the former is restricted to those characters used before the founding of the Republic of China in 1911.

Characteristics 

Sawndip is made up of a combination of Chinese characters, Chinese-like characters, and other symbols. Like Chinese it can be written horizontally from left to right, or vertically from top to bottom. The script has never been standardized; some morphosyllables have more than a dozen associated variant glyphs. According to Zhang Yuansheng (张元生), characters not also used in Chinese usually make up about 20% of Sawndip texts, although some texts may be composed almost entirely of characters also used in Chinese.

Classification
Different scholars categorize Sawndip in slightly different ways. Displayed below is the estimated frequency of different types of characters by Holm:

According to Bauer, Sawndip characters can be categorized using a more complex system than the six traditional classification principles:
Symbols that do not resemble Chinese characters, and are borrowed from non-Chinese writing systems such as the Latin alphabet and (possibly) Burmese
Non-standard Chinese-like characters created via ideogrammatic compounds
Non-standard Chinese-like characters created via phono-semantic compounds
Standard Chinese characters borrowed solely for their pronunciations, and do not share the same original meaning in Chinese (in accordance with the phonetic loan principle)
Non-standard Chinese-like characters created specifically for Zhuang to indicate the meaning of certain morphosyllables (in accordance with indicative ideograms)
Standard Chinese characters representing loanwords or etymologically related morphosyllables from Chinese
Standard Chinese characters borrowed solely for their meanings and do not have a matching reading in Zhuang with Chinese
New characters made by juxtaposing a pair of Chinese characters that "spell out" the pronunciation of the Zhuang word as in the traditional Chinese fǎnqiè system, with one character representing the initial consonant and the other the rest of the syllable.

History 
The script has been used for centuries, mainly by Zhuang singers and shamans, to record poems, scriptures, folktales, myths, songs, play scripts, medical prescriptions, family genealogies and contracts, but exactly when it came into being is not known. It is usually reckoned that Sawndip started to be used over one thousand years ago in the Tang dynasty or earlier. However a study comparing Sawndip with the similar but different neighbouring chữ Nôm script of Vietnam suggested that the script started at latest in the 12th century at about the same time as chữ Nôm.

Early vernacular characters

Even before the Tang dynasty, Zhuang or closely related languages were written down using characters that were either Chinese or made up of Chinese components. Whether these are viewed as Sawndip, or as some sort of precursor to Sanwdip, depends not only the evidence itself, but also differing views of what counts as Sawndip and from what era the term Zhuang can be applied.

Some scholars say Sawndip started in the Han dynasty and note the occurrence on words of Zhuang origin in ancient Chinese dictionaries such as 犩 which is Sawndip for the Zhuang vaiz (water buffalo) and in section 19 of Erya is given as having similar pronunciation and means 牛 (cow, cattle). 

There are some similarities in the poetical style of "The Song of the Yue boatman" from 528 BC and the Zhuang "Fwen" style. Wěi Qìngwěn (韦庆稳) has interpreted the song by reading the characters as Zhuang and some consider the written version and other such songs to be a forerunner though not an example of Sawndip, it has also been interpreted as being Thai, Dong and Cham.

Tang dynasty (7th–9th centuries)
The fact that Zhuang readings of borrowed Chinese characters often match Early Middle Chinese suggests a Sui–Tang date, however it has been noted these could also be explained as later borrowings from conservative Pinghua varieties. Chinese characters were already in use in the Zhuang area, as illustrated by two Tang dynasty steles entitled Liù hé jiāngù dà zhái sòng (六合坚固大宅颂 "Eulogy of the six-sides courtyard", 682) and Zhì chéng bēi (智城碑 "Monument of Zhi Cheng city", 697). Although these are written in Chinese, the latter contains a number of non-standard characters. One of these is the Sawndip character consisting of 𥹫 over 田 for naz, "paddy field".

Song dynasty (10th–13th centuries)

Several Song dynasty Han Chinese authors give examples of "vernacular characters" (Tǔsú zì 土俗字) used in Guangxi such as Zhou Qufei in Lingwai Daida and Fan Chengda in Guìhǎi yúhéng zhì (桂海虞衡志) saying that such characters were common in the area and used in legal documents such as indictments, complaints, receipts and contracts.

Table of characters noted in the Song dynasty Guìhǎi yúhéng zhì and also in 1986 Sawndip dictionary.

Ming dynasty (14th–17th centuries)
Whilst no manuscripts from the Ming dynasty have been found, dozens of classic Sawndip works that survive to this day were first written during this dynasty or earlier. Some consider this to be the most abundant period of Sawndip literature. Exact dating is difficult in part because some songs were composed and transmitted orally before being written down, such as Fwen Ciengzyeingz ("Song to tell others"), which Liang Tingwang (梁庭望) has stated whilst containing some content comes from centuries before that was written down during the Ming dynasty. Similarly "Songs of March", "Songs of the Daytime", "Songs of the Road", and "Songs of House Building" where first created between the Tang and Song dynasties or earlier and certainly written down at latest during the Ming dynasty
 
Some songs were both created and written down during the Ming dynasty. Fwen Caeg "Songs of War" (Chinese: 贼歌 Zéi gē) from Pingguo which is considered to be such despite some lines which are later additions.壮族嘹歌研究 editor 覃乃昌 广西民族出版社 2008  page 48-52"Fwen nganx" "欢𭪤" (The Dragon Eye Fruit [龙眼] Song) a love story is also from the Ming Era.

A number of songs written in Sawndip are stories which are originally of Han origin but for hundreds of years have been part of the Zhuang tradition, such as "𠯘唐皇" Fwen Dangzvuengz (Song about Tang Emperors) about Li Dan and "𠯘英台" Fwen Yinghdaiz (Song about Yingtai) and "𠯘文隆" Fwen Vwnzlungz (Song about Wenlong) to name but a few are reckoned to have first been written down in Sawndip during the Ming dynasty or earlier. In the case of Fwen Vwnzlungz the original Han story itself has been lost.

Qing dynasty (mid-17th–19th centuries)
Thousands of Sawndip manuscripts from the Qing period survive to this day. One well known old surviving text is the Yuèfēng (粵風) book of folksongs from Guiping, published in the 18th century. A book entitled Taiping Spring (太平春) that contains a number of songs and is kept in Lingyun is dated as 1682.

Another source is the Huáyí yìyǔ (華夷譯語 "Chinese–barbarian vocabulary") compiled by the Bureau of Translators in the mid-18th century on the order of the Qianlong Emperor, and now held in the archives of the Imperial Palace Museum. The survey of western Guangxi (太平府夷语通译 Tàipíng fǔ yíyǔ tōngyì) was less thorough than other parts of the empire, consisting of just 71 to 170 items from three different locations. Each entry consists of a Zhuang word written in the Zhuang script, with its pronunciation and meaning given in Chinese. It demonstrates both the wide use and lack of standardization of Sawndip.

Modern era (20th–21st centuries)

Whilst after the introduction of an official alphabet-based script in 1957, Sawndip have seldom been used in some formal domains such as newspapers, laws and official documents, they continue to be used in less formal domains such as writing songs, and personal notes and messages.

After the Chinese Revolution in 1949, even communist revolutionary propaganda was written using sawndip. In 1957 an official romanized Zhuang script was introduced. However, there are major phonetic and lexical differences between Zhuang dialects, and the Latin-based system is based on the Wuming dialect. Because of this and other reasons, there still are many Zhuang speakers that prefer to write Zhuang using sawndip. Even though it is not the official script at grassroots level various departments have continued to use Sawndip on occasions to get their message across. Coming into the 21st century, Sawndip understanding and usage of Sawndip remains significant: of those surveyed in two dialect areas, just over one third said that they understood Sawndip, and about one in ten that they use Sawndip in most domains. These rates are approximately twice those for the romanized script: with only one-sixth saying they understood it, and only one in twenty saying they used it in most domains.

In 2008 it was announced that work was to begin on a new dictionary called The Large Chinese Dictionary of Ancient Zhuang Characters (中华古壮字大字典). In 2012 an enlarged facsimile of the 1989 dictionary was published with a different cover.

Unicode

Unicode versions 1 to 8 included some Sawndip characters that are frequently used in the Chinese names for places in Guangxi, such as   meaning 'mountain' or  ndoeng meaning 'forest', and are therefore included in Chinese dictionaries, and hence also in Chinese character sets and also some that are from other non-Zhuang character sets. Over one thousand Sawndip characters were included in the CJK Unified Ideographs Extension F block that was added to Unicode 10.0 in June 2017, and a further batch of Sawndip characters are under consideration for inclusion in a future version of the Unicode Standard.

 Literature 

For over one thousand years the Zhuang have used Sawndip to write a wide variety of literature, including folk songs, operas, poems, scriptures, letters, contract, and court documents. Sawndip literature is often though not always in verse. Only a small percentage of Sawndip literature has been published. Traditional songs, or stories, are often adapted over time, and new works continue to be written to this day.

Regional differences
With regional differences, as with other aspects of Sawndip scholars express a number of differing ideas.

One of the first systematic studies of Sawndip that covered more than one location was Zhang Yuansheng's 1984 examination of 1114 Sawndip, mainly from Wuming but also including some characters from 37 other locations. Zhang found substantial variation between dialect areas, and even within locales.

In 2013, David Holm reported a geographical survey of the script, comparing characters used for 60 words in texts from 45 locations in Guangxi and neighbouring areas. He found that regional variations in the script often did not correlate with dialect groups, which he attributes to importation of characters from other regions, as well as subsequent sound change. However, he claims to have found a clear geographical division in terms of the branch of Chinese that provided the pronunciation of borrowed characters. In Guizhou and northern Guangxi, character readings correspond to Southwest Mandarin, which was brought to the area by the armies of the Ming dynasty. In central and southwest Guangxi, they closely match Pinghua, which is derived from the speech of Han dynasty immigrants. Holm states that while both Pinghua and Zhuang have changed over this period, this has generally been in parallel, making it difficult to date the readings. Scholars studying the script used in Guizhou associate its origins with the introduction of Chinese officials in the early Qing dynasty.

 Example text 
From Article 1 of the Universal Declaration of Human Rights in Northern Zhuang:

Latin transcription (1982 orthography): "Boux boux ma daengz lajmbwn couh miz cwyouz, cinhyenz caeuq genzli bouxboux bingzdaengj. Gyoengq vunz miz lijsing caeuq liengzsim, wngdang daih gyoengq de lumj beixnuengx ityiengh."
Latin transcription (1957 orthography): "Bouч bouч ma dəŋƨ laзƃɯn couƅ miƨ cɯyouƨ, cinƅyenƨ cəuƽ genƨli bouчbouч biŋƨdəŋз. Gyɵŋƽ vunƨ miƨ liзsiŋ cəuƽ lieŋƨsim, ɯŋdaŋ daiƅ gyɵngƽ de lumз beiчnueŋч ityieŋƅ."
Unicode characters (with currently unencoded characters represented as Ideographic Description Sequences in brackets): 佈佈[⿰𧾷马][⿰丁刂]𨑜[⿰云天]就[⿰口眉]自由, 尊严[⿰⺅受]权利佈佈平等。[⿰⺅众]伝[⿰口眉]理性[⿰⺅受]良心, 应当待[⿰⺅众][⿰⺅爹]㑣[⿰彳比][⿰彳农]一样。

 See also 
Chinese characters
Chinese family of scripts
Chữ Nôm
Sawgoek
Standard Zhuang

Notes

ReferencesWorks cited'''

 
 
 
 
 
 
 
 
 

 Further reading 

 
 Liáng Tíngwàng 梁庭望 (ed.): Gǔ Zhuàngzì wénxiàn xuǎnzhù 古壮字文献选注 (Tiānjīn gǔjí chūbǎnshè 天津古籍出版社 1992).
 Lín Yì 林亦: Tán lìyòng gǔ Zhuàngzì yánjiū Guǎngxī Yuèyǔ fāngyán'' 谈利用古壮字研究广西粤语方言. In: Mínzú yǔwén 民族语文 2004.3:16–26.
 覃暁航：「方塊壮字経久不絶却難成通行文字的原因」『広西民族研究』，2008年3期。

External links 

 Asian Character Tables, Free (GPL) Sawndip data.
 Zhuang language & alphabet, Omniglot

Logographic writing systems
Graphemes
Chinese scripts